Down East is a term for parts of eastern New England and Canada's Maritime Provinces.

Down East may also refer to:

Down East (magazine), a monthly magazine in Maine
Down-East Village Restaurant & Motel, the oldest motel in Maine at the time of its demolition
Down East (North Carolina), a region of coastal North Carolina
Down East Books, a publishing imprint of Rowman & Littlefield
Down East Yachts, a former American sailboat manufacturer
 Down East fiddling, a type of Canadian fiddling
Downeast Airlines, a former commuter airline based in Rockland, Maine, from 1960 to June 1, 2007

See also
Down Easter (disambiguation)
East Down (disambiguation)
Way Down East (disambiguation)